Porchlight Music Theatre is a professional theatre company in Chicago, Illinois that has won numerous Joseph Jefferson Awards in its 25-year history. The company has come to embody the slogan "american musicals. chicago style."

About 
Its initial production in 1995 was the premiere of Women Who Love Science Too Much by K.R. Cahill and directed by William Eric Bramlett. 

In 2010, Michael Weber took over artistic direction. Weber previously served as artistic director for the inaugural season of Drury Lane Theatre Water Tower Place (now the Broadway Playhouse) and at Theatre at the Center (1998–2004). 

During the 2016–2017 season, the theatre attracted record attendance with its staging of In the Heights. This production changed the face of the company and helped the company move to the Ruth Page Center for the Arts, in Chicago's Gold Coast.

Productions

New Faces Sing Broadway Series 
Porchlight created this revue series which runs for one to two nights. It is an audience-interactive event that encompasses the 'hits and misses' of a given season on Broadway. The night is emceed by a local theatre star and showcases ten rising music theatre talents.

Porchlight Revisits Series 
Since 2013, the company has staged series' of 'lost' musicals. There are three of these productions per season. Each production runs for three nights. Before each performance, there is a "Behind the Show Backstory" multimedia presentation by Artistic Director Michael Weber explaining the history of the production.

Education 
Since 2014, the company has offered children and professional artists the opportunity to pursue training in singing, dancing, acting, and writing. It is an environment where working artists can practice and create with other artists. It provides scholarship events and offers summer camps and school-year programming for local teachers. Porchlight also offers rehearsal space to rent out.

Awards
Porchlight Music Theatre has received a total of 42 Jeff Awards and 139 Jeff Award nominations. They have additionally received 7 Black Theatre Alliance awards and 22 Black Theatre Alliance nominations. 

Below are the productions that have won an Equity Joseph Jefferson Award and the season in which it was won.

References

External links
 Home Page

Theatre companies in Chicago
Musical theatre companies